The Stätzerhorn (also known as Piz Raschil) is a mountain of the Plessur Alps, overlooking Lenzerheide in the canton of Graubünden. With an elevation of 2,575 (8,445 ft) metres above sea level, the Stätzerhorn is the culminating point of the range that lies west of the Lenzerheide Pass. Several trails lead to the top from both sides of the mountain. In winter the Stätzerhorn is part of a ski area.

References

External links
 Stätzerhorn on Hikr

Mountains of the Alps
Mountains of Switzerland
Mountains of Graubünden
Two-thousanders of Switzerland
Domleschg